Ogoh Odaudu (born 3 August 1981) is a Nigerian retired basketball player and current coach. He currently is the head coach of Rivers Hoopers of the Nigerian Premier League. In his playing years, Odaudu was a player of the Nigeria national basketball team.

Playing career
Born in Jos, he has played for the junior Nigerian national team at the 1999 FIBA Under-19 World Championship.

Odaudu was a member of the Nigerian senior team and played with the team at the 2001, 2003 editions of FIBA Africa Championship. He also played at the 2006 Commonwealth Games.

Coaching career
Odaudu has been the head coach of Rivers Hoopers since its establishment in 2009, He coached the team to three Premier League titles. As such, the team qualified for the 2021 BAL season where he coached at the inaugural tournament. Since 2019, Odaudu has been an assistant coach of the Nigerian national team. He was an assistant coach at the 2020 Olympics in Tokyo. Odaudu was the head coach of Nigeria at AfroCan 2019.

References

1981 births
Nigerian men's basketball players
Nigerian basketball coaches
People from Jos
Living people
Basketball Africa League coaches